The Sinclair Service Station in Tulsa, Oklahoma, at 3501 E. 11th St., was built in 1929.  It was listed on the National Register of Historic Places in 1996.

The station is located on the original U.S. Route 66 (11th St.).  Its NRHP nomination asserts it "is an excellent example of a Spanish Eclectic service station. The station consists of three parts; the office, the covered gas pump area, and an attached double-bay service garage. A stucco exterior, a triangular parapet, and the tile, visor roof are all characteristics commonly associated with the architectural style."

References

External links

Gas stations on the National Register of Historic Places in Oklahoma
National Register of Historic Places in Tulsa, Oklahoma
Mission Revival architecture in Oklahoma